François Divisia (1889–1964) was a French economist most noted for the Divisia index and the Divisia monetary aggregates index.

Notable publications
 Divisia, F. (1925) L'indice monétaire et la théorie de la monnaie. Revue d'écon. polit., XXXIX, Nos. 4, 5, 6: 842-61, 980-1008, 1121-51.
 Divisia, F. (1926) L'indice monétaire et la théorie de la monnaie. Revue d'écon. polit., LX, No. 1: 49-81.
 Divisia, F. (1928) L'économie rationnelle, Paris: Gaston Doin et Cie.

References

French economists
Fellows of the Econometric Society
Presidents of the Econometric Society
1889 births
1964 deaths
Place of birth missing